Northfleet School for Girls is a high school for girls, located in Northfleet in the English county of Kent.

The school first opened in March 1937 in a new building next to Northfleet School for Boys in Colyer Road. In 1950 The Upper School moved to the current school site in Hall Road in 1950, with the rest of the school following in 1955. that the whole school was able to move to the new buildings. Building work for the South Wing of the school were started in 1971.

It is a foundation school administered by Kent County Council, who coordinate admissions. As a foundation school, it is supported by a Cooperative Learning Trust which includes The Co-operative Group, Age UK, North West Kent College, the University of Greenwich and the Workers' Educational Association as partners.

Northfleet School for Girls offers GCSEs and BTECs as programmes of study for pupils, while students in the sixth form have the option to study from a range of A Levels and further BTECs.

References

External links
Northfleet School for Girls official website

Girls' schools in Kent
Secondary schools in Kent
Gravesham
Educational institutions established in 1937
1937 establishments in England
Foundation schools in Kent